Benedetta Carlini (20 January 1590 – 7 August 1661) was an Italian Catholic  nun who claimed to experience mystic visions. As abbess of the Convent of the Mother of God, at Pescia, she had a sexual relationship with one of her nuns, Sister Bartolomea. These came to the attention of the Counter-Reformation papacy, determined to subordinate potentially troublesome mystics if they showed any signs of independent or heretical spirituality. Although they paid three to four visits to the nunnery, it was not until they interrogated Sister Bartolomea that they found that Benedetta and Bartolemea had engaged in sexual relations. Bartolomea gave testimony that Benedetta engaged in frottage with her while possessed by the spirit of a male demon known as Splenditello. Benedetta was stripped of her rank and imprisoned.

Early life

Her father was Giuliano, a rich and devout man who owned his house and several other properties in Vellano and a small farm nearby. Her mother was Midea Carlini (born Midea d'Antonio Pieri), a sister of the parish priest. Benedetta was an only child in her middle-class Italian family; Giuliano provided in his will that after his own and his wife's death, his house should be turned into an oratory dedicated to the Mother of God.

Midea's labour was very difficult, painful and dangerous both for her and her daughter, both of whom survived. Giuliano had decided to name the girl Benedetta—meaning "blessed"—and dedicate her to God's service. Soon after her birth, her family retired to her father's farm in the mountains, where she was nursed by her mother and not a wet nurse.

Benedetta's father educated her himself, an unusual choice in Renaissance Italian society, in which most girls took lessons from their mothers and were not very literate. Her education and upbringing were religious. At the age of five, she knew the litany of the saints and other prayers by heart. Under her father's tutelage, Benedetta would take the rosary and recite the litany several times a day. At the age of six, Benedetta learned to read and knew some Latin.

Her mother instructed Benedetta to recite five Pater Nosters and eight Ave Marias every day, seemingly directing Benedetta toward female guides—the Virgin Mary, a statue of whom had been acquired especially for Benedetta, and St. Catherine of Siena, whose mystical marriage with Christ was celebrated as a feast day at their home.

One day a black dog tried to drag Benedetta away, but her screams frightened it; by the time her mother came, the dog had disappeared. Benedetta and her parents interpreted this incident as the work of a devil disguised as an animal.

In spring 1599, Giuliano decided to fulfill the vow made at the birth of his daughter and bring Benedetta to a group of religious women in Pescia.

Convent 

In 1599, Benedetta joined a group of unmarried women who wanted to lead an ascetic life; the group did not live in a regularly enclosed convent, and were not recognised religious sisters. The group lived in a retreat in a private house, where women led a communal life engaged in prayer, spiritual exercises and the production of raw silk. This community had been formed nine years earlier (in 1590) by Piera Pagni, the widow of a prominent Pesciatine. One of her kinsmen, Antonio Pagni, founded an independent religious congregation for men in 1588. He had obtained a degree in canon law at the University of Pisa; he was joined by Father Paolo Ricordati and several other priests and laymen. Because of their reputation for saintliness, local people soon began to call them Theatine fathers. However, they called themselves Fathers of the Holy Annunciation, and they were not members of the Theatine Order of Clerics Regular founded in 1524 by St. Cajetan Thiene. Fathers of the Holy Annunciation agreed to back a female community founded by Piera Pagni and provide spiritual direction to the women in it. Paolo Ricordati was their father confessor. Thus, local people began to call Piera Pagni, and her subordinates "Theatines", although the Theatine Order of Clerics Regular was a male religious order.

In 1599, there were three official monasteries in Pescia: San Michele (founded in the 12th century), Santa Chiara (founded in the 1490s) and the recently formed Santa Maria Nuova. However, due to the rapid growth of Pescia, the Valdinievole province and the religious revival, there was not enough space for all who wished to become nuns or monks. Many girls were refused entrance to these institutions and had no place to go. Convents required novices to pay an expensive subscription. "Brides of Christ", like brides of laymen, were accepted only with dowries. Dowries of wellborn Prescia brides amounted to 1500 scudi, and a place in a prestigious female convent like Santa Chiara cost around 400 scudi, when a skilled worker earned not more than 55 or 60 scudi a year. A semi-monastic community founded by Piera Pagni required only about 160 scudi, which Benedetta's parents were able to pay.

In the last half of the 16th century, many religious communities like this appeared, offering an alternative to many women who could not or did not want to join already established convents. Some of the most devout and successful female religious orders, the Ursulines among others, started from such modest origins. Women with strong religious vocations often preferred such groups to well-established convents. These convents were often considered to be corrupt because many nuns had not joined them by choice; they had been sent there by relatives or had been driven there by a hopeless situation. The life of discarded daughters of aristocratic families in the convents was, in many ways, also indistinguishable from the life of the upper classes on the outside.

A community that Benedetta joined had adopted the Rule of Saint Augustine. Originally a letter that Augustine of Hippo addressed to a group of nuns led by his sister, who were experiencing difficulties in the governance of their convent, the Rule does not regulate in detail all aspects of monastic life. It provides a set of spiritual counsels within which more specific rules could be accommodated by individual communities. It touched on such topics as the need to lead a communal life with no private property, the observance of prayers, the mortification of the flesh through fasts, the need for modest dress, and so on. This was accepted by many female convents and quasi-monastic communities. For the members of these groups, the Fathers of the Holy Annunciation created a hierarchy of authority. "They have among themselves a female superior under whom they govern themselves, a teacher of the novices, and other customary offices as if they were full-fledged nuns".

As soon as her father left her in a community house, nine-year-old Benedetta kneeled in front of the statue of the Madonna and said, "My most sweet Mother, I have left my carnal mother for you, I beg you to take me as your daughter." Not long after this, Benedetta prayed there again, and the statue fell over. As a young novice, she was frightened, but thought this was a miracle, showing that the Mother of God wanted to kiss her. Whereas before Benedetta had accepted miracles as being in the nature of things, now she was astounded and awed by this action of the Virgin, which testified to the mighty power of God.

Benedetta's first years in this Catholic retreat were unremarkable. Twenty years later, other community members remembered that she was always very obedient and exemplary in all her actions, took communion twice a week and never did anything worthy of rebuke. If anything supernatural was happening to her during that time, only Benedetta herself knew about it.

In 1610, the community of Benedetta acquired a farm in the commune of Fucecchio for 1750 scudi and became quite economically successful and self-sufficient. The group's annual revenues came to 300 scudi, of which half came from the silk work done by its members and the rest from their dowries and from this farm and others. Thus, the following year, they received permission from Rome to organize a general chapter and accept new girls. After that, the community started constructing a new convent building, which was completed in October 1613. In April 1618, the nuns asked the secular authorities for permission to enlarge the convent enough to accommodate up to 30 sisters; though they had just 18 sisters, they were confident of the future growth of their numbers. The project they proposed would cost 4,000 scudi, part of which was for dismantling a section of the city wall to make way for the building. Despite the difficulties, the construction was approved and began soon after.

Visions and spiritual experiences 
In 1614, just before the Pescia Theatines received permission to build their convent, Benedetta, now a young woman of 23, reported to her mother superior and father confessor about her supernatural visions. The first had occurred one morning while she was praying. Suddenly, she felt herself to be in a beautiful garden with many fruits and flowers. In the centre was a fountain with scented water, and next to it was an angel, holding a signboard with gold letters: "Whosoever wants to take water from this fountain, let him purge his cup or not come nearer." Because she did not understand the meaning of this inscription, she asked the angel. He explained, "If you want to know God, lift all earthly desires from your heart." On hearing these words, Benedetta felt a strong urge to take leave of the world, but, instead, the vision ceased, and with great inner wrenching, she returned to the normal world of the senses. Afterwards, she felt great happiness and a stronger desire than ever to be good. In the next visions, she saw a man dressed in great splendour who saved her from wild lions, scorpions and boars and said he was Jesus and the animals were demons. Another time, a young boy appeared and told her to climb the Mount of Perfection, which was very difficult and, the boy said, would be impossible without a true guide, her father confessor.

Some of Benedetta's visions had occurred in the presence of witnesses, who had observed that during prayer she had gone into a trance-like state in which she gesticulated and made incomprehensible sounds. During these episodes, her altered state of consciousness had made it impossible for her companions to receive answers to their questions about what was happening to her.

Particularly visual forms of mental prayer were widespread spiritual practice in pre-modern Europe. Visualization of people, places and events in the life of the Holy Family was recommended in prayers manuals by Luis de Granada, St. Charles Borromeo and others, which Benedetta occasionally read.

Benedetta's own reactions to her visions were mixed. At the time, there was less concern as to whether a "vision" was a product of imagination or mental illness; more concerning were whether these messages were diabolical or divine in origin. Her father confessor, Paolo Ricordati, initially told her to disbelieve anything she saw as not to give the devil grounds on which to work his tricks, to try to repress the onset of visions and to "pray to God that He send her travails instead of ecstasies and revelations, since it seemed to her that this would be safer against the deceits of the devil." Benedetta did as he said. She could keep herself from having visions, but she had great difficulty in receiving some sort of travail. Only in 1615, her prayers were answered, and she began to experience such intense pains over her entire body that she was paralyzed by them. The physicians could neither diagnose it nor determine what to do. None of the remedies eased Benedetta's pain. She thought that this mysterious illness was the sign of divine favour that Paolo Ricordati had asked for. She expected recognition of others for being the recipient of extraordinary grace and was to be sadly disappointed. Nothing had changed, and for two years, Benedetta suffered in the quiet obscurity of a monastic communal life of prayer, fasts, and manual work.

In 1617, her visions resumed. But instead of encounters with Jesus and angels, Benedetta now was pursued at night by handsome young men who wanted to kill her and who beat her all over with iron chains, swords, sticks, and other weapons. She also experienced excruciating physical pain. The men in her visions urged her to come with them and leave the Theatines, telling her by persevering in her monastic life she would only make herself ill without being certain of the salvation of her soul. One of them even asked Benedetta to be his bride, and when she refused, he tried to take her with brute force. The attacks took place several times a week and lasted for six to eight hours. One night, instead of enduring the visions, Benedetta called other nuns for help. After that, her superiors assigned her a young companion, Bartolomea Crivelli, to help her in her battles with the devil. Bartolomea was to share Benedetta's cell and to keep an eye on her at all times. If at this point the confessor and the mother superior had any further concerns about the validity of Benedetta's claims, they did not voice them. Instead, the convent was now seen as being graced by the presence of a mystic whose body was the battleground between supernatural forces. The confessor and mother superior became extremely solicitous of her welfare and, because of her weakened condition, excused her from participation in many of the daily routines of the community.

In 1618, construction of a new monastery building was coming to a close. The resettlement to the  new convent building was a solemn procession. Benedetta walked in an ecstatic trance, seeing the angels of Pescia paying homage to her and scattering flowers along her path as if she were the image of St. Dorothy, the patron saint of Pescia, which was being paraded in its annual procession through town. Once they arrived at the gates of the convent, the Madonna greeted her and gave her companion two guardian angels. No one other than Benedetta could see the flowers and angels, but many citizens saw her in that unusual state.

Abbess with stigmata 

Three months after the resettlement, on the second Friday of Lent, Benedetta received the stigmata. By her own words, these appeared between two and three at night when she was in bed. She saw a crucifix and bright rays from wounds of Christ to her head, hands, feet and side of the chest. These rays caused tremendous pain, but then Benedetta felt such contentment in her heart that she had never experienced before. Bartolomea Crivelli was near, and she was the first to see the signs on Benedetta's body. Also, she saw that Benedetta arranged herself in the form of the Cross and became as red as a glowing ember and heard that Benedetta said, "My Lord, there are others who are better than me, I don't deserve this since I am a sinner." Then Benedetta asked Bartolomea to lift her by the arm because she could not do it by herself. And Bartolomea saw red marks like small rosettes on Benedetta's hands, feet, and side, and also a deep red band around her head, but it was bloodless.

The stigmata were the first material evidence of supernatural phenomena that happened with Benedetta. Her heavenly grace had been quickly recognized, and sometime between February and May 1619, the nuns' community elected her to be their abbess.

During the Lenten season of that year, Ricordati was regularly visiting the convent to hear Benedetta give sermons to the other nuns while they purified themselves with their whips as part of their penance. As she talked to them, she was always in a trance and spoke, not as herself, but as an angel who persuaded the nuns to lead a better life. This angel usually ended the sermons by praising Benedetta, chosen above all others to receive the signs of God's grace. Had Benedetta not been in an altered state of consciousness, Paolo Ricordati would not have allowed her to give sermons because "it is shameful for a woman" to speak in a Christian church, even for an abbess. But if a woman had been favoured with the gift of prophecy of other divine gifts, she could be an exception.

Heart Exchange and Splenditello Angel 

On March 21, 1619, Paolo Ricordati summoned Benedetta and told her: "Today is the day of St. Benedict, your saint's day, go in ecstasy at your pleasure, I give you permission."

It was an experiment to examine if her visions would come on command. That evening, during compline, Benedetta fell into a trance. Then at night, Benedetta experienced a new miracle that she had never had before. She saw Christ looking like a handsome young man with long hair and a long red robe. He was accompanied by St. Catherine of Siena and other figures.

Benedetta turned to Bartolomea, saying: "I don't know if it is the devil's work; pray to God for me. If it is the devil's work, I will make the sign of the cross on my heart, and he will disappear."

The young man explained that he was Jesus and had come to Benedetta to take her heart. She laughed, "What would you do, my Jesus! You have come to take my heart, but I don't want to do it without the permission of my Spiritual Father."

The young man reminded her that the confessor had said she could do anything that was God's will without any reservations. Benedetta supported that Jesus had taken her heart and returned three days after to put another heart in her body.

By his miraculous power, it was possible to live so long without a heart. Bartolomea later said that when she was helping Benedetta with her blankets, she came up to her and felt her chest around where her heart should be, and felt a void.

To maintain Benedetta's physical purity, Jesus ordered her not to eat meat, eggs, and milk products and not to drink anything but water. To maintain her spiritual purity, he assigned her a guardian angel, Splenditello, to point out her falling when she did something wrong.

This angel appeared as a beautiful boy dressed in a white robe crowned by a wreath of flowers. In his hand, he held a green wand, about two feet long, on one side of which were flowers, and on the other thorns. The flowers were for when she did things that were pleasing to Jesus, the thorns were to punish her when she did not. And she felt pain if she did something wrong, because Splenditello touched her with the thorny side of a wand. Receiving corporal punishment from an angel and such intensive purification of the body was very unusual for Catholic nuns and saints.

Once settled in their new quarters, the Theatines began the final round of administrative procedures to become a regular convent. In 1619, they asked Pope Paul V to grant them complete enclosure. When the papal officials who handled such petitions received the request, they asked the provost of Pescia to send in a report about them.

Marriage with Christ 

On 20 May 1619, Jesus appeared to Benedetta in vision and announced that he wanted to marry her in a solemn ceremony a week later.

He issued detailed instructions on the decoration for the chapel. The upper part of the altar should be covered with light blue cloth, the right side with red cloth and the other two sides in green. The floor also should be covered: images of Christ and Madonna, flowers of all sorts and colours, three chairs and 12 pillows must be there.

All nuns in the house would be at the ceremony with lighted candles and then this Jesus will say them through Benedetta's lips what to do and where to go.

Benedetta doubted if this was genuine Jesus or some diabolic illusion and hesitated to tell Father Ricordati all the details of her vision, but three days later she revealed it. She wondered about the public nature of the event, and the work it required because Jesus didn't usually reveal himself in such a public fashion. But Ricordati unexpectedly let her proceed and other nuns had already started to decorate the convent because, in one of her recent ecstasies, Benedetta had spoken of the impending marriage and possibly couldn't remember this in the normal state of conscience.

Because the community did not have a whole set of things needed for a solemn mystical marriage ceremony, they sent a servant off to borrow the altar cloth from several people outside the convent. They asked some of the religious institutions in the vicinity to contribute candles and solicited the pillows and flowers from various other quarters.

The candles were sent by the Fathers of Holy Annunciation, by the convent of Santa Maria Nuova and by people of the mountain country. Baskets of flowers arrived from everywhere. The tree chairs came from the Prior of Pescia.

Nuns had received so many gifts that they didn't know what to do with all of them. Word of what was happening spread and many people wanted to participate, but no one, not even Father Ricordati, was allowed by the provost to enter the convent during the preparation or the ceremony itself.

On the morning of Holy Trinity (27 May 1619), Benedetta heard an inner voice telling her that she should dress the two novices as angels. She quickly wrote a note to Father Ricordati to obtain his permission. This done, she and the others went to Choir, where she picked up a basket of flowers, scattered its content throughout and then lit the candles, giving one to each. Benedetta instructed nuns to get on their knees and to do as she told. Taking up the crucifix, she began to intone Veni Creator Spiritus as she led a procession out of the choir, onto the garden, and then back around the choir where all of them sang various hymns and the litanies to the Virgin. After scattering incense and bowing several times in the direction of the altar, Benedetta knelt and resumed singing by herself. Her voice was scarcely audible and her words could not be made out.

Then Benedetta had a new vision of Jesus, so bright and beautiful she could hardly look at him. And he said: "Rejoice, today I will marry you." Next came the Madonna with a retinue of angels and saints. Benedetta replied that she did not want to consent, as she was not sure whether he was Jesus or the devil. "I am not the devil, but your Jesus," he answered, "give me your hand because I want to put the ring on you." Benedetta said: "But Jesus, I am not worthy." The Madonna then took her right hand, and Jesus placed the ring on her finger. Benedetta kissed the ring. Jesus told her that no one else would see the ring but her. Then this supernatural man, invisible for all but Benedetta, made a whole sermon and represented her as his bride and servant, who is the greatest that he has in the world, and told all to obey her. Benedetta spoke in a tone that seemed to the other nuns more beautiful than her usual voice.

After this sermon, Benedetta had returned to her normal senses and began to leave the choir, almost as if nothing had happened. Along the way, she stopped to chat with the wife of the Vicar who, in defiance of the provost's orders, had come to the convent to witness the wedding.

Some other participants of the event were in doubt about this possible wonder. No one other than Benedetta had seen Jesus, the Madonna, the saints or the ring. They knew that St. Catherine's marriage with Christ had left no visible evidence too, but the desire for publicity was unusual for a true mystic and seemed suspicious, especially if other people there didn't see any supernatural person or objects.

Benedetta's contemporaries were well aware that because women were denied a place in the social and public discourse of their age, they thought to make their voices heard in other ways. Having religious visions was one way women could have their voices heard. For example, Maria de la Visitación, the nun from Lisbon, also had the stigmata and became one of the most influential European women of the 1580s, consulted by rulers and high church officials, before she was discovered to be a fraud. It has been suggested that such could be the case with Benedetta.

The First Investigation 
Not only the nuns of the Congregation of the Mother of God were concerned about Benedetta's religious experience, but also the leading ecclesiastical official in the town - provost of Pescia Stefano Cecchi, and Pescian secular authorities. Speaking through Benedetta, Jesus had said extravagant words of praise for her and the threat for damnation for those who did not believe in her. And he said that the fate of the townspeople was in Benedetta's hands. Such behaviour was not characteristic of holy people, whose messages from the divine contained praises of the Lord rather than themselves and who gained followers by their character and deportment rather than by threats. As the wedding preparations had already demonstrated, despite the provost's feeble efforts to curb any publicity about the affair, many people had become interested in Benedetta's mystical powers. Citizens not well-informed about religion were very inclined to believe in the unproven miracles. And the situation might get out of control of ecclesiastical and secular authorities.

So provost Stefano Cecchi ordered all those who had witnessed the mystical marriage of Benedetta and Christ to talk no further about this with outsiders. On 28 May 1619, the day after this ceremony, he came to examine Benedetta himself. Benedetta was relieved of her duties as abbess until further notice, and Felice di Giovanni Guerrini came to this duties.

Firstly Stefano Cecchi had examined the stigmata of Benedetta Carlini since they were the only visible signs of miraculous intervention. Christ had said during Benedetta's sermon of the previous day that the wounds on her body would be open and larger in appearance than before. The provost, therefore, looked at her hands, feet, and side, where he could see bits of dried blood about the size of a small coin. When they were washed with warm water, each revealed a small opening from which drops of fresh blood trickled out. When the blood was dried with a towel, more came out. On Benedetta's head were many bloody marks, which also bled into the towel when washed with warm water. The stigmata, which day ago had been nothing more than small red marks, had changed just as Christ predicted. Then the provost asked Benedetta to recount how wounds came to be on her body. She told about five rays from the crucifixion in her vision during Lent and about that she felt pain not all time: "On Sundays, they seem to be numb; on Mondays and Tuesdays I have almost no pain; and all the other days I have great pain, especially on Fridays."

After the first visit of the provost, Benedetta went into the trance and wrote two letters: to Ricordati and Cecchi. But after the trance, she could remember only former, in which she asked her father confessor for permission to write directly to the provost or meet with him. Ricordati denied her request because if Christ wanted to communicate with the provost, he would find other means for doing so. But then Ricordati forwarded to Cecchi the letter that Benedetta had written to himself. Benedetta did not know about this, and when Cecchi came again on 7 June 1619 and asked her what she wanted to tell him, she seemed nonplussed and had nothing to say. The provost had examined Benedetta's stigmata again and saw a few changes. The wound on the right hand did not bleed when washed and dried with a towel. The puncture marks on the head were also dried and looked partly healed. The provost was perplexed, but there was nothing to be done, and the visit came to an end. Then he had been visited and examined Benedetta fourteen times between late May and early September.

On June 14, the observation of stigmata revealed that some of the wounds that had almost healed the week before were now bleeding again. The provost ordered Benedetta to cut her hair and wash her head to make the wounds more visible. Benedetta was allowed to leave the room briefly to rearrange and close her garments before returning for further questioning. Suddenly she run back in, holding her hands to her head. "Jesus, what is this?" she exclaimed as blood gushed down her face and onto the floor. The visitors managed to staunch the blood with towels. But the examination had to be cut because Benedetta was in too much pain to continue. But this was not the end of the investigation, just a postponement.

In June 1619, Benedetta revealed to Father Ricordati that she had again seen Jesus in a vision. This time he was an angry and vengeful Christ with an unsheathed sword ready to strike. And he threatened to punish the people of Pescia with the plague for their grievous sins while no one was willing to ask for mercy. Benedetta offered to pray for his mercy herself and to be the instrument of the town's salvation by spending her time in Purgatory until the day of judgment. Christ's anger seemed to be appeased by her words. He told her to continue to love him always and to arrange for processions to placate him. Ricordati gave her permission to organize a procession with an image of Christ at the head.

On July 23, Cecchi met with Felice di Giovanni Guerrini, Bartolomea Crivelli and with another nun, Margherita d'Iptolito Ricordati, a relative to Paolo Ricordati. Their testimonies did not result in any major new revelations. The main obstacle to officially sanctioned public recognition was the absence of a ring on Benedetta's finger. Other nuns were unable to see it because she always covered up that hand. But Margherita Ricordati said that she saw a yellow band with a cross that didn't look like a ring. When Benedetta was called to the examination room, she had an ordinary, inexpensive gold ring on the fourth finger of her right hand. On the top side of a ring, there were five points the size of ordinary pinheads. A point in the middle was dark red. The ecclesiastical examiners were eager to probe further, but Benedetta was feeling too ill to answer.

Finally, the provost of Pescia Stefano Checchi and other investigators had concluded that Benedetta's visions were genuine visions and neither dreams nor fantasies, and their religious content conformed to church dogma and practice. So Benedetta had been recognized as a true visionary.

The provost must have written favourably since in July 1620, he and the Vicar of Pescia made one last visit to the convent to conclude the enclosure. On July 28, Pope issued the bull that made this female religious community a fully enclosed convent. According to the nuns' wishes, it was called the Congregation of the Mother of God and would be under the protection of St. Catherine of Siena. No longer would they have to go outside their convent to hear Mass, but more importantly, as nuns, their vows of poverty, chastity, and obedience would become solemn vows. Any nun wishing to leave the convent could be constrained to stay by her superiors and by the secular authorities. Similarly, any laypersons trying to enter the convent without permission could also be punished. After the convent was granted full enclosure, Benedetta was reinstated as abbess.

Resurrection 
There is little information available about the next several years of Benedetta's life. It seems that she managed successfully her abbess' duties. When the nuns were cloistered and could not leave the convent area even for a short time, a board of outside administrators had been established in the fall of 1620 to aid Benedetta with some of her tasks. Members of the board helped to manage the convent's properties and to market its silk and agricultural products.

Benedetta's father, Guiliano, died between November 1620 and March 1621. Soon after that, when Benedetta went into her trances, one of her guardian angels, Tesauriello Fiorito, began to prophesize her imminent death. He would urge the nuns to treat their abbess with greater tenderness than before because her days on earth were numbered. And only after her death would they realize her true value because there was no one else in the convent as fit to be their abbess as she. After this vision, Benedetta herself began to speak about her death and even had her grave opened and readied for the day when it would be needed.

On the day of Annunciation (25 of March 1621), the nuns witnessed Benedetta's death and called Paolo Ricordati. He arrived immediately and commanded Benedetta in a loud voice to return to the living, which, to everyone's astonishment, had the desired effect. When Benedetta revived, she told the assembled that she had seen angels and demons, Purgatory and Paradise, her father and several other deceased people.

The Second Investigation 
Sometime between August 1622 and March 1623, Alfonso Giglioli, a newly appointed papal nuncio in Florence, decided to re-investigate Benedetta's case and sent several of his officials. These investigators were more sceptical than previous. Unlike the Theatine nuns, Paolo Ricordati, or Stefano Cecchi, they had nothing to gain from Benedetta's claims.

The doubts of the investigators about the reported miracles and visions were strengthened by their interpretation of Benedetta's character. Her mystical experiences contained immodest and lascivious language. Her so-called angels bore peculiar names - Splenditello, Tesauriello Fiorito, Virtudioello, and Radicello. These sounded more like the names of evil spirits than of heavenly creatures. Investigators did not find in Carlini charity, humility, patience, obedience, modesty, and other virtues to the eminent and heroic degree which usually accompany the true spirit of God. She lacked the extraordinary personal virtues that would make her a role model for other good Christians. New investigators found contradictions in Benedetta's visions. For example, in one of them, the Virgin had asked her to obtain permission from Father Ricordati to have a guardian angel but, before this request, such an angel had already appeared in her early visions. It was obvious to all that God neither lied nor was ever contrary to himself. And even Benedetta's visible stigmata could be not the marks of Christ but of the devil because these appeared not during the fervor of prayer, in the harshness of the wilderness, or during a long period of solitude, but when she lying softly in bed where the enemy of God resides.

Further doubts were cast on the divinity of Benedetta's mystical exchange of hearts with Christ and marriage with him, regarding Benedetta's need for help from Bartolomea to complete this wonder. And the solemn public ceremony of marriage with Christ seemed too suspicious. Investigators believed that Christ might need the publicity of it only for a demonstration of a miracle to the people. But none were seen until two months later, when a rather shabby looking ring, not nearly as beautiful and brilliant as one Benedetta had described, appeared on her right hand.

Also, investigators discovered that Benedetta likely had a hereditary demonic obsession. Both her parents had allegedly been possessed for some time. Despite the seeming aversion to the meat and milk products, Benedetta was secretly fetching salami and Cremonese style mortadella to where she could eat them undisturbed. But one time, another nun saw it. This was like Benedetta's father's behavior when he "too was assailed by spirits". Testimonies of other nuns made it clear that some of Benedetta's supernatural phenomena were falsifications. Two nuns spied on Benedetta through the hole in her study door and more than twenty times saw her renewing her wounds with a large needle. Another nun had seen her put her blood on a statue of Christ, which Benedetta then claimed began to bleed in honour of her sanctity. Other witnesses saw that she had made the star herself with some gold foil and fixed it on her forehead with red wax. And Benedetta said that Christ kissed her forehead and left a gold star. When she spoke as an angel in one of her ecstasies, that the Theatines could learn from her how to flagellate themselves with true spiritual fervour. The nun, who had been standing nearby, noticed that Benedetta didn't strike herself even once, and that to make it seem as though she had she smeared the whip with blood from her wounds in her hand. Three nuns also reported that she sometimes ran barefoot through the convent as if her feet were healed, and one heard her exclaim as she jumped down from a small table, "Whoever saw me jump down would say that there's nothing wrong with my feet."

Bartolomea gave more testimonies. She eventually found a small brass box containing diluted saffron in Benedetta's desk. This saffron and Benedetta's blood probably had been used to paint the ring. But the most shocking confession was about the lesbian relationships between Bartolomea and Benedetta. As investigators reported, "This sister Benedetta, then, for two continuous years, at least three times a week, in the evening after disrobing and going to bed would wait for her companion to disrobe, and pretending to need her, would call. When Bartolomea would come over, Benedetta would grab her by the arm and throw her by force on the bed. Embracing her, she would put her under herself and kissing her as if she was a man, she would speak words of love to her. And she would stir on top of her so much that both of them corrupted themselves. And thus by force she held her sometimes one, sometimes two, and sometimes three hours". And "Benedetta would tell her that neither she nor Benedetta were sinning because it was the Angel Splenditello and not she that did these things. And she spoke always with the voice which Splenditello always spoke through Benedetta. . . ." Benedetta refused to admit that she had engaged in sexual acts and claimed she could not remember what she did when Splenditello spoke and acted through her.

The investigators were not prepared for such things because in Italy and Europe in the 17th century were very few documented cases of sexual relationships between women, and much more cases of heterosexual fornication between a nun and her male lover and cases of male homosexuality. Yet that two women should seek sexual gratification with each other was virtually inconceivable despite such cases had been described in the legal commentaries of Antonio Gomez, Gregorio Lopez and Prospero Farinacci, which had been printed and widely circulated throughout Italy in the previous decades.

The second investigation had been completed on November 5, 1623, when the clerics submitted their "Last Report" to the nuncio. Then they saw no traces of the stigmata and the ring on Benedetta's body. And when she was asked about angels, visions, apparitions, revelation and ecstasies, Benedetta answered that she no longer saw any of them. She was not an abbess anymore and lived the life of an obedient nun under the care of a new abbess. The investigators concluded that "all the things that were done in her or by her, not only those which are deemed sinful, but also the other deeds which were held to be supernatural and miraculous were done without her consent or her will, since they were done while she was out of her senses by the work of the devil." Also, they concluded that the ineptness of Paolo Ricordati was a crucial factor in allowing the situation to continue as long as it did. While the ecclesiastical investigators who wrote the last report on Benedetta seemed disposed toward leniency and emphasized her lack of consent and will, the final judgement need not necessarily absolve her from guilt. It would be up to the nuncio to determine in which direction the sentence and punishment would go.

Later life and death 
Information pertaining to the Nuncio's decision and Benedetta's later life are limited, with the only written account being found on the fragment to a diary belonging to an unnamed nun. She wrote on August 7, 1661, claiming that "Benedetta Carlini died at age 71 of fever and colic pains after eighteen days of illness. She died in penitence, having spent thirty-five years in prison." The words in the diary suggest that Benedetta was not imprisoned until 1626, three years after the second investigation. The official decision about Benedetta's imprisonment has not survived.

The conditions of Benedetta's imprisonment were most likely harsh. Ecclesiastical authorities had adopted Constitution by St. Teresa, who stated that sins of the flesh are the gravest of nuns' faults. And the punishment for these sins must be solitary confinement for life. The guilty sister "shall in no case, even though she repent and implore mercy and pardon, be received back into the community, save if some reasonable cause supervene and on the recommendation and advice of the visitor". Other nuns, except wardens, must not speak with the punished one or send her anything under pain of suffering the same penalty. A sister in prison should have her veil and scapular taken away. She should be let out only to hear mass and to follow the other nuns to the place where they disciplined themselves with their whips. On those days, she might be allowed to eat on the floor of the refectory, near the door so that the others might step over her as they left the room. Several times a week, she should receive only bread and water for sustenance.

Word of the death of Benedetta Carlini spread quickly outside the convent walls. People of Pescia did not forget her even forty years after the events that brought her notoriety and thirty-five years of strong social isolation. Perhaps the reason was that her prophetic warnings to those who refused to believe in her had finally come to pass and in 1631 the plague did indeed strike Pescia. And many people had never really believed in the officials' efforts to discredit her miracles. A crowd gathered near the convent's gate. People wanted to see and touch Benedetta's body or even take some of it with them like the relics of a saint. But the nuns barred the doors of the church to avoid any uproar and tumult until the burial. They brought dead Carlini into the church as they do with the other nuns and dressed her with the black veil and habit worn by the others.

Alternative interpretations of Carlini
E. Ann Matter, a feminist religious scholar, has an alternative perspective on the case of Benedetta Carlini, and wrote about it in the Journal of Homosexuality in 1990. She compared and contrasted two autobiographical accounts from Benedetta Carlini and another 17th-century Italian Catholic mystic, Maria Domitilla Galluzzi of Pavia. Carlini and Galluzi were both self-designated visionaries and highly regarded by their religious and secular communities, but each was subject to suspicion and close scrutiny by church hierarchy. Benedetta Carlini's trial records related the aforementioned series of sexual contacts with Bartolomea, while Maria Domitilla Galluzzi seems to have had no sexual experiences within her own mystical framework. Matter's article questioned whether scholars might have succumbed to the temptation to simply transpose the sexual self-understanding of figures in their own historical context to past historical environments. "Lesbian nun" might be viewed as too simplistic a description, and alongside Maria Galluzzi, Benedetta Carlini's sexuality "might be viewed as organised around an elaborate organic connection between the spiritual and the sensual."

Judith C. Brown chronicled Carlini's life in Immodest Acts (1986), which discussed the events that led to her significance for historians of women's spirituality and lesbianism. Matter has written extensively on Galluzzi in other contexts, and Brown's study of Carlini occurs in greater depth than that of her counterpart.

More recently, Brian Levack has analysed the Carlini case and others in the context of his work on demonic possession and exorcism in the Baroque era of 17th and 18th century Europe. He notes that the case in question was anomalous, as according to Carlini's account, she was possessed by an angelic entity, Splenditello, when she made love to Sister Bartolomea. Levack departs from the above authors in placing the event in philosophical and historical context, noting the rise of nominalism within 17th and 18th century Catholic thought, which attributed greater scope for agency and supernatural activity from demonic entities than had previously been the case. Such signs were described as convulsions, pain, loss of bodily function (and other symptoms that one might describe as apparent epilepsy from this description), levitation, trance experiences, mystical visions, blasphemy, abuse of sacred objects and vomiting of particular objects as well as immoral actions and gestures and exhibitionism. Levack argues that this provided the female subjects of exorcist rituals with the chance to engage in relative social and sexual agency compared to gender role expectations of social passivity. Possession was a form of dramaturgy and religious theatre, Levack argues, as was demonology. According to Levack, then, Carlini and other recorded instances of Baroque possession were engaged as active participants within a social ritual and theatrical performance that reflected contemporary Baroque religious culture.

In popular culture, Canadian playwright and director Rosemary Rowe has written a play about her affair with Sister Bartolomea, Benedetta Carlini: Lesbian Nun of Renaissance Italy.

In film 
Paul Verhoeven has directed a film loosely based on Benedetta Carlini called Benedetta released in 2021. She is portrayed by Virginie Efira.

See also
 Immodest Acts: The Life of a Lesbian Nun in Renaissance Italy

Notes

References

Bibliography
 
 Brian Levack: The Devil Within: Exorcism and Possession in the Christian West: New Haven: Yale University Press: 2013: 
 
 
E. Ann Matter: "Discourses of Desire: Sexuality and Christian Women's Visionary Narratives" in Journal of Homosexuality: 18/89(1989–1990): 119 - 132
 
Rosemary Rowe: Benedetta Carlini: Lesbian Nun of Renaissance Italy. Independently published (English & Italian): 2019: 
 
 
 
 
 Vanda (playwright): 'Vile Affections: Based on the True Story of Benedetta Carlini', 2006: (First produced at the New York International Fringe Festival, August, 2006. Recently translated into German.) see www.vandaplaywright.com

1590 births
1661 deaths
17th-century Christian mystics
17th-century Italian Roman Catholic religious sisters and nuns
LGBT Roman Catholics
Italian lesbians
LGBT history in Italy
People from Pescia
Roman Catholic mystics
17th-century LGBT people
Italian Christian mystics